The Mallock U2 is a  race car, originally designed, developed and built by Ray Mallock Ltd., in 1979. It was originally constructed to compete in a purpose-built front-engined sports prototype cars, called Clubman. It was versatile, as it also competed in Formula Junior, Formula Ford, and Formula Three events. The chassis was constructed out of a steel tubular spaceframe, and it was later equipped with a De Dion rear axle, in 1972. It was very light, weighing only . It was powered by a number of different four-cylinder engines; including an  Ford Sidevalve engine, a smaller  Ford Kent engine, an  BMC A-series engine, and even a  Ford-Cosworth SCA/Cosworth FVA engine. This drove the rear wheels through a conventional 4-speed manual transmission; first used in the Austin A30.

References

Formula Three cars
Formula Junior cars
Formula Ford cars
Sports prototypes
Open wheel racing cars